The flag of Serbia and Montenegro was originally adopted on 27 April 1992 as the flag of the Federal Republic of Yugoslavia (FR Yugoslavia) and was used as such from 1992 to 2006. After the country was renamed to the State Union of Serbia and Montenegro in February 2003 it remained in use as the national flag until the country's dissolution in June 2006.

Aside from a different aspect ratio, it is essentially the same flag as the one once used by the Kingdom of Yugoslavia (1918–1941). The tricolor without a red star in the centre was inherited from the flag of its direct predecessor state, the Socialist Federal Republic of Yugoslavia (1943–1992). It was similar to an inverted Dutch flag.

History 
The flag of Serbia and Montenegro had its origins in the flag of Yugoslavia used by the Kingdom of Yugoslavia which was later amended by the Socialist Federal Republic of Yugoslavia government to display a socialist red star. Following the fall of communism and breakup of Yugoslavia, the remaining republics of Serbia and Montenegro reconstituted the country as the Federal Republic of Yugoslavia and initially retained the original SFR Yugoslavia flag. However on 27 April 1992, the FR Yugoslavia adopted a new flag by removing the socialist red star from the old one. This made Yugoslavia the last country in Europe to remove a red star from its flag. However, due to United Nations Security Council Resolution 777, FR Yugoslavia was not permitted to inherit SFR Yugoslavia's United Nations membership. Between 1992 and 2000, the old SFR flag continued to fly outside the United Nations Headquarters as the new government refused to apply for membership as the Yugoslav government believed they were a direct continuation of the previous state. When FR Yugoslavia were allowed to join in 2000 following a successful application, the old flag was removed and replaced with the Federal Republic flag.

The decision to change the flag was controversial with socialist parties in Yugoslavia. When it was unveiled, Socialist Party of Serbia councilors in Tutin, Serbia refused to work on the municipal council on the grounds that "the flag of another state is displayed in the offices of the Town Hall". The International Olympic Committee also did not allow athletes from Yugoslavia to compete under the new flag at the 1992 Summer Olympics in Barcelona, Spain. Instead, they competed as Independent Olympic Participants at the 1992 Summer Olympics and marched under the neutral Olympic flag. 

In 2003, when Yugoslavia was renamed as Serbia and Montenegro, there was dispute over any new symbols to be used for the nation. It was alleged that the new Constitutional Charter of Serbia and Montenegro prohibited the use of the old Yugoslavian symbols until a law on them was brought before the Parliament of Serbia and Montenegro and one was required to be brought within sixty days of the new Parliament sitting. However it was argued there was little point in changing the flag for the new state as the individual regional flags of Serbia and Montenegro only differed from the Yugoslav flag in the shade of blue used. It was also argued that it was pointless trying to change the flag because the two sides would not be able to agree upon a logical new flag. As predicted, the Serbian and Montenegrin delegations were unable to agree on a new flag so they continued to use the old Yugoslavian flag until the union's dissolution in 2006. Some Serbians and Montenegrins started to reject the flag in favour of the old flag of SFR Yugoslavia due to a sense of nostalgia and due to a feeling of abandonment from the international community. Montenegro did not support the flag continuing to be used to represent them and in 2004, the Parliament of Montenegro adopted a new flag to replace the flag of Serbia and Montenegro within their republic. However, this remained a regional flag within the union until Montenegrin independence in 2006. 

During the dispute following the change of name from Yugoslavia to Serbia and Montenegro, the flag was used to represent Serbia and Montenegro in football as UEFA allowed the Serbia and Montenegro national football team to continue to use the Yugoslavian flag and their Yugoslavian kits whilst the decision was made. In 2006, shortly after the country's dissolution, the Serbia and Montenegro football team entered the 2006 FIFA World Cup using the flag they had qualified under. Paradoxically the team was representing a country that no longer existed nor used the flag of Serbia and Montenegro as both countries upon independence adopted their own flags.

Post-dissolution 
Following Montenegro voting for independence and the union being dissolved by a unanimous vote of the Serbian deputies (as the Montenegrin deputies had boycotted it), the flag was lowered from the Parliament building in Belgrade on 5 June 2006. At the Serbian military headquarters, the flag was ceremonially lowered to "Hey, Slavs", the Serbian and Montenegrin national anthem, overseen by the Minister of Defence Zoran Stanković. Following the dissolution of Serbian and Montenegro, the two successor states adopted their own flags. Montenegro continued to use the regional flag they had adopted in 2004. Serbia adopted a new flag using the same colours of the flag of Serbia and Montenegro (with the three coloured bars in a different order) but included the coat of arms of Serbia defaced on it.

Other flags

Rank flags

See also

 Coat of arms of Serbia and Montenegro
 Coat of arms of Serbia
 Coat of arms of Montenegro
 Flag of Yugoslavia
 List of Yugoslav flags
 Flag of Serbia
 List of Serbian flags
 Flag of Montenegro
 List of flags of Montenegro

References

External links

 

Serbia and Montenegro
Flags of Yugoslavia
Serbia and Montenegro
1992 establishments in Yugoslavia
2006 disestablishments in Serbia and Montenegro
2006 disestablishments in Serbia
2006 disestablishments in Montenegro

de:Flagge Jugoslawiens#Flagge der Bundesrepublik Jugoslawien und Serbien und Montenegro